Empress Sunjeonghyo,or literally known as Sunjeong, the Filial Piety Empress (Hangul: 순정효황후, Hanja: 純貞孝皇后; 19 September 1894 – 3 February 1966), of the Haepyeong Yun clan, was the second wife and first Empress Consort of Emperor Yunghui, the last ruler of the Korean Empire.

Biography

Early life
Yun Jeung-sun (Hangul: 윤증순, Hangja: 尹曾順) was born in Seoul to Lady Yu of the Gigye Yu clan and Yun Taek-yeong, a member of the Haepyeong Yun clan and an official of Joseon. Yun Bo-seon, the 2nd president of the Republic of Korea, was her ninth cousin three times removed. Yun is also a 15th great-granddaughter of Princess Jeonghye, a daughter of King Seonjo and younger sister of Grand Prince Jeongwon, who was the father of King Injo. As well as an 11th great-granddaughter of Yun Doo-su.

On her mother’s side, Yun’s grandfather, Yu Jin-hak, was a maternal adoptive nephew of Queen Shinjeong; thus making her the adoptive great-grandniece of the late Queen.

Marriage and Life in the Palace
To how Lady Yun was chosen to be the next wife of crown prince was from the help of Imperial Consort Sunheon. 

Prior to the marriage, the Imo Incident of 1882 had forced Empress Myeongseong to flee from the palace, which brought Eom to demonstrate extreme loyalty to Gojong. The imperial consort, known at the time was Court Lady Eom, and the king became close during that time until Queen Min returned to the palace. 

In 1885, the Queen consort expelled Eom from the palace when she discovered Eom wearing Gojong's clothing (seung-eun) at the age of 32. Her expulsion stripped her of her position and title, but a high-ranking official, Yun Yong-seon, Lady Yun’s grandfather, purportedly interceded on her behalf with Gojong, and she was forgiven. Eom never forgot the grace of Yun Yong-seon.

Because the seat was vacant, Imperial Consort Sunheon recommended the adoptive great-granddaughter of Yun after Crown Prince Yi Cheok’s first wife, Crown Princess Consort Min, died on 5 November 1904. 

Yun Jeung-sun married the 32-year-old Crown Prince Cheok on 24 January 1907 at the age of 13. When she became Crown Princess Consort, her mother was given the royal title of "Internal Princess Consort Gyeongheung of the Gigye Yun clan" (Hangul: 경흥부부인 기계 유씨, Hanja: 慶興府夫人 杞溪 兪氏) while her father was given the royal title of "Internal Prince Haepung, Yun Taek-yeong" (Hangul: 해풍부원군, 윤택영, Hanja: 海豊府院君 尹澤榮).

On 20 July 1907, she became Empress Consort of Korea when her husband ascended the throne after the forced abdication of his father, Emperor Gwangmu. The Empress was demoted by the Japanese government by the Japan-Korea Annexation Treaty of 1910 and thereafter officially known as Her Majesty, Queen Yi of Korea (this title, however, was ignored in Korea).

Because of her demotion, she was known by her given alternative royal title as Queen Yun (윤비, 尹妃) and lived at Daejojeon Hall. But when she was given the royal title of Queen Yi of Changdeok Palace (창덕궁 이왕비, 昌德宮 李王妃), she eventually moved into the palace’s Nakseon Hall when her husband’s health worsened.

Empress Sunjeonghyo became a widow on 24 April 1926, when Emperor Yunghui died without issue at the Changdeok Palace in Seoul. Emperor Yunghui had been rendered infertile (and was also said to be mentally disabled) by poisoning in the 1898 Coffee Poisoning Plot.

In 1939, the Queen’s family clan was pressured to change their family name to a Japanese surname. At the time, Sōshi-kaimei was a policy of pressuring Koreans under Japanese rule to adopt Japanese names. But her uncle, Yun Deok-yeong, opposed such a thing to happen and maintained their Korean surname.

Korean War
During the Korean War, Empress Sunjeonghyo stayed in Changdeok Palace as long as she could in the face of advancing forces from North Korea.  During the war, the soldiers of North Korea invaded the palace but she reproved them and drove them all out. She then escaped secretly to the Unhyeon Palace when the war situation became too serious. As the war progressed, she moved to Busan with other Imperial family members, including Princess Hui (wife of Prince Wanheung). According to The World is One, Princess Yi Bangja's autobiography, Empress Sunjeonghyo went to Busan on foot.

After the Korean War

After the war, the new government of President Rhee Syng-man, jealous of the popularity of the Imperial House, prevented Empress Sunjeonghyo from entering the Changdeok Palace.  She was kept imprisoned in Suin Hall, a narrow and unsuitable cottage in Jeongneung, Seoul. After a change in government in 1961 she returned to Nakseon Hall, Changdeok Palace with her dutiful ladies-in-waiting: Park Chang-bok (d.1981), Kim Myung-gil (d.1983) and Sung Ok-yeom (d.2001), and five other staff.

Empress Sunjeonghyo became a Buddhist in her later years. She died childless on 3 February 1966, aged 72, at Nakseon Hall, Changdeok Palace, Seoul from a heart attack. She was given a state funeral and a private Buddhist funeral. She is buried beside her husband, Emperor Yunghui and his first wife, Empress Sunmyeong, at the Yureung Imperial Tomb.

Family 
 Great-Great-Great-Great-Great-Great-Grandfather
 Yun Sang-myeong (윤상명, 尹商明)
 Great-Great-Great-Great-Great-Grandfather
 Yun Deuk-il (윤득일, 尹得一)
 Great-Great-Great-Great-Grandfather
 Yun Myeon-dong (윤면동, 尹冕東)
 Great-Great-Great-Grandfather
 Yun Myeong-ryeol (윤명렬, 尹命烈)
 Great-Great-Grandfather
 Yun Chi-hui (윤치희, 尹致羲) (1797 - 1866)
 Great-Great-grandmother
 Lady Jo of the Pungyang Jo clan (정경부인 조씨, 貞敬夫人 趙氏) (1794 - 1875) (본관: 풍양 조씨, 豊壤 趙氏)
 Great-grandfather
 Yun Wi-seon (윤위선, 尹爲善) 
 Adoptive great-grandfather: Yun Yong-seon (윤용선, 尹容善) (1829 - 1904)
 Adoptive great-grandmother: Lady Kim of the Andong Kim clan (정경부인 안동 김씨, 貞敬夫人 金氏) (1826 - 1879)
 Grandfather
 Yun Cheol-gu (윤철구, 尹徹求)
 Grandmother
 Lady Hong (정경부인 홍씨)
 Father
 Yun Taek-yeong (윤택영, 尹澤榮) (1876 - 24 October 1935)
 Uncle: Yun Deok-yeong (윤덕영, 尹德榮) (27 December 1873 - 18 October 1940)
 Aunt: Kim Bok-soo (김복수, 金福綏) (2 December 1872 - 10 June 1950)
 Mother
 Internal Princess Consort Gyeongheung of the Gigye Yu clan (경흥부부인 기계 유씨, 慶興府夫人 杞溪 兪氏) (1866 - 1936)
 Maternal Grandfather: Yu Jin-hak (유진학); adoptive nephew of Queen Shinjeong
 Siblings
 Older brother: Yun Hong-seop (윤홍섭, 尹弘燮) or Yun Song-mu (윤송무, 尹松茂) 
 Sister-in-law: Han Yoo-sang (한유상)
 Sister-in-law: Yi Yong-suk (이용숙)
 Younger brother: Yun Ui-seop (윤의섭, 尹毅燮) (8 March 1912 - 25 February 1966); succeeded his father in becoming Marquis 
 Sister-in-law: Kim Hyeon-jeong (김현정) (1917 - 1957)
 Younger sister: Yun Hee-seop (윤희섭, 尹喜燮) (6 November 1905 - ?)
 Brother-in-law: Yu Eok-gyeom (유억겸, 兪億兼) of Gigye Yu clan (23 October 1895 - 8 November 1947) (본관: 기계 유씨, 杞溪 兪氏)
 Husband
Emperor Sunjong (25 March 1874 – 24 April 1926) — No issue.
 Mother-in-law: Empress Myeongseong (17 November 1851 – 8 October 1895)
 Father-in-law: Emperor Gojong (9 September 1852 - 21 January 1919)
 Issue
 Adoptive son: Prince Yi Jin (이진, 李晉) (18 August 1921 - 11 May 1922)

In Popular Culture 
 Portrayed by Jang Seo-hee in the 1990 MBC TV series 500 Years of Joseon: Daewongun
 Portrayed by Kim Ji-mi in the 1966 film The Last Empress
 Portrayed by Song Seo-ha in the 2016 film The Last Princess

See also
Korean Empire
History of Korea
House of Yi

References

1894 births
1966 deaths
Korean empresses
House of Yi
Converts to Buddhism
Korean Buddhist monarchs
Korean Empire Buddhists